A kneeler is a cushion (also called a tuffet or hassock) or a piece of furniture used for resting in a kneeling position during Christian prayer.

In many churches, pews are equipped with kneelers in front of the seating bench so members of the congregation can kneel on them instead of the floor. In a few other situations, such as confessionals and areas in front of an altar, kneelers for kneeling during prayer or sacraments may also be used. Traditionally, altar rails often have built-in knee cushions to facilitate reception of Holy Communion while kneeling.

A kneeler is also a part of the prie-dieu prayer desk.

Kneelers in churches are a modern development. Kneeling was not part of the Mass in early Christianity, and has been part of the Catholic Mass since the 16th century.

See also
 Hassock
 Knee pad

References 

Furniture
Kneeling